Jerry Edwin Abramson (born September 12, 1946) is an American Democratic politician who was the 55th lieutenant governor of Kentucky.  On November 6, 2014, Governor Steve Beshear announced that Abramson would step down from his position as lieutenant governor to accept the job of Director of Intergovernmental Affairs in the Obama White House.  He was replaced by former State Auditor Crit Luallen.

Abramson previously served as the mayor of Louisville for an unprecedented two decades.  He was the only three-term mayor of the old city of Louisville (1986–1999) and subsequently served two terms as the first mayor of the consolidated city-county of Louisville Metro (2003–2011).

Abramson's long period of service to Louisville as its mayor, as well as the weak opposition he faced in mayoral elections, led to the local nickname of "Mayor for life", a title frequently used by Louisville's own popular radio personality Terry Meiners. Abramson's popularity resulted in Bluegrass Poll approval ratings ranging from a 91 percent high in 1990 to a 73 percent low in 1994.

From 1993 to 1994, he was President of the United States Conference of Mayors. He was a member of the Mayors Against Illegal Guns Coalition, an organization formed in 2006 and co-chaired by New York City mayor Michael Bloomberg and Boston mayor Thomas Menino.

At the conclusion of Obama's second term, Abramson returned to Louisville to serve as Executive-in-Residence at Bellarmine University. He had previously served in the same post in 2011. He departed Bellarmine University in 2018 and is currently serving as Executive-in-Residence at Spalding University.

Early life

Abramson grew up in the Louisville suburb of Strathmoor Village, Kentucky.  Before serving as a mayor of Louisville, he worked at Abramson's Market at 738 South Preston Street in Louisville's Smoketown neighborhood, then owned by his father Roy and founded by his grandparents. He graduated from Seneca High School and served for two years in the Army, but did not see combat.

While a student at Indiana University Bloomington, Abramson became active in politics by volunteering for Robert F. Kennedy's 1968 campaign for president. After graduating from IU, Abramson attended Georgetown University Law School.

Abramson practiced law with Greenebaum Doll & McDonald, PLLC. Before his first run for mayor, Abramson also served as alderman for two terms and as general counsel to governor John Y. Brown Jr.

Mayor of Louisville

In the 1985 general election, Abramson defeated the Republican candidate Bob Heleringer, a conservative member of the Kentucky House of Representatives from 1980 to 2002. Abramson was highly popular as mayor from 1986 to 1999 because of growth in the Louisville economy as the decline in urban population that began in the 1950s slowed greatly. Abramson began the nonprofit civic beautification program Operation Brightside, which included the $700 million expansion of Louisville International Airport. He worked to revitalize the city's waterfront with the creation of Waterfront Park and expanded the local economy by recruiting the international headquarters for Tricon Global Restaurants (now Yum! Brands), the Presbyterian Church (USA) and United Parcel Service Air Hub 2000 (a facility now known as Worldport).

Abramson normally would have left office in 1998. However, his original third term was extended by one year as part of a state-mandated transition to align the dates of local and federal elections.

Subsequent to his first tenure as mayor, Abramson practiced law with the Frost Brown Todd firm and taught at Bellarmine University.

Mayor of Louisville Metro

After the merger of Louisville and Jefferson County was approved, the previous term limits no longer applied. Abramson was easily elected the first Mayor of Louisville Metro in 2002 by 73.4 percent of the vote over Republican challenger Jack Early, former mayor of Hurstbourne, Kentucky, a major suburb of Louisville.

One of Abramson's first actions as Metro Mayor was to appoint Robert C. White Chief of the troubled Louisville Metro Police Department, the first African-American to hold the post. The move proved to be politically wise, helping to calm criticism of the department from the black community in Louisville.

Abramson was re-elected mayor in November 2006; his opponents were Republican Metro Council member Kelly Downard and Independent Ed Springston.

Abramson is the first person of Jewish faith to have served as mayor of Louisville. He lives in the Crescent Hill neighborhood with his wife, Madeline.

Kentucky Monthly magazine's readers voted Abramson "Kentucky's Best" civic figure five times (2002–2006).

Lieutenant Governor of Kentucky

On July 19, 2009, Kentucky Governor Steve Beshear announced that Abramson would step down after his second term as Mayor of Louisville Metro to run as Lieutenant Governor in his re-election campaign in 2011. This came after Dan Mongiardo decided to run for U.S. Senate. Since Abramson's planned departure was announced, many candidates announced they would run to succeed him in 2010. Businessman Greg Fischer won the Democratic nomination and general election to succeed Abramson.

The Beshear-Abramson ticket won in a landslide against Senate President David Williams and his running mate Richie Farmer. Abramson took office as the 55th Lieutenant Governor of Kentucky on December 13, 2011. His political future had been a subject of considerable speculation, but in an August 2013 speech before the Elizabethtown Rotary Club, he announced that he would not run for governor in 2015, saying,I would like to in the next chapter of my life focus on one thing I really believe will make a significant difference in the development of Kentucky. And that focus is on education.

Resignation as Lt. Governor and Presidential Appointment
On November 6, 2014, Abramson announced that he had been appointed by President Barack Obama to the position of Deputy Assistant to the President and White House Director of Intergovernmental Affairs. Abramson also informed Gov. Beshear of his intention to resign as Lieutenant Governor of Kentucky effective November 13, 2014, at 5:00 PM. Gov. Beshear also announced on November 6 his appointment of former State Auditor Crit Luallen to serve out the remainder of Abramson's term.

Return to Bellarmine University
In early 2017, upon Obama's exit from the White House, Abramson rejoined the faculty of Bellarmine University as its Executive-in-Residence.

Move to Spalding University in 2018

In late 2018, Abramson left Bellarmine to join Spalding University in Louisville as its Executive-in-Residence. At Spalding, the university named a lecture series after Abramson in early 2019. "The Abramson Leadership Exchange" was a partnership with Ignite Louisville and Young Professionals Association of Louisville, with the former Mayor chairing the events, the Abramson Leadership Exchange brought the university's Ed.D. students, alumni, and community leaders together for panel discussions on cutting-edge topics related to public affairs, government, media, and business.

See also

 Government of Louisville, Kentucky
 Louisville Metro Council
 Louisville mayoral election, 2010

References

External links

 
 Beshear/Abramson 2011
 Mayor's webpage on Louisville Metro Government website
 Profile in The Economist
 The U.S. Conference of Mayors website
 
 

|-

|-

|-

1946 births
21st-century American Jews
American gun control activists
Bellarmine University faculty
Georgetown University Law Center alumni
Indiana University Bloomington alumni
Jewish American people in Kentucky politics
Jewish mayors of places in the United States
Kentucky Democrats
Lieutenant Governors of Kentucky
Living people
Mayors of Louisville, Kentucky
Presidents of the United States Conference of Mayors
Seneca High School (Louisville, Kentucky) alumni